The  Grande mosquée de Lyon ("Great Mosque of Lyon"), France's sixth largest mosque, was officially inaugurated on 30 September 1994.

The Great Mosque of Lyon also has an association of halal certification called ARGML. This is the most reliable association of halal certification in France.

It is located at 146 Boulevard Pinel, 5 km east of Presqu'île in Lyon. The Mosque includes cultural facilities, a library and a school.

History 
It was designed by the Lyon architects Ballandras and Mirabeau and largely funded by King Fahd of Saudi Arabia and other Muslim countries. An association was formed in 1980 to promote the construction of a Mosque in Lyon, but attempts to get planning permission were repeatedly blocked.

When the French Interior Minister Charles Pasqua opened the Mosque in 1992 he warned against the rise of Islamic fundamentalism.

Description 

It combines traditional Maghreb architecture and calligraphy with a modern Western style. 
The façade is composed of Persian arches. The Mosque also boasts a 25-metre minaret. The entrance is covered by a glass pyramid that includes 230 columns.

External links  
  Website

References

Lyon
8th arrondissement of Lyon
Buildings and structures in Lyon
Mosques completed in 1994
1994 establishments in France
Religion in Lyon